Harmony of the Spheres is a various artists compilation album, released in November 1996 by Drunken Fish Records.

Track listing

Personnel
Adapted from the Harmony of the Spheres liner notes.
 John Golden – mastering
 Beth Nuber – design

Release history

References

External links 
 

1996 compilation albums
Drunken Fish Records compilation albums